Thailand is a country of some 70 ethnic groups, including at least 24 groups of ethnolinguistically Tai peoples, mainly the Central, Southern, Northeastern, and Northern Thais; 22 groups of Austroasiatic peoples, with substantial populations of Northern Khmer and Kuy; 11 groups speaking Sino-Tibetan languages ('hill tribes'), with the largest in population being the Karen; 3 groups of Austronesian peoples, i.e., the Malay, the majority ethnic group in the southernmost three provinces, together with the Moken and Urak Lawoi ('sea gypsies'); and both groups of Hmong-Mien.

Historical development

Background 
Thailand was mainly inhabited by indigenous Austro-Asiatic (Mon-Khmer, Khmu, and Lawa) peoples in the central plains and Northeast, and in the South by Malayo-Sumbawan (Malay) peoples, until the Tai arrived. Following the arrival of the Tai, Hmong and Mien arrived in the West and North from China (Guizhou), either via Laos or Vietnam and then Lao, or in the case of the Loloish Tibeto-Burman peoples (Akha, Lahu), over several centuries up until approximately the twentieth century. The Karen, another Tibeto-Burman people, arrived at and began populating the border between Burma and Siam in the 13th century. Thailand also became home to large numbers of Thai Chinese during the main period of Chinese emigration.

The arrival of the Tai 
From approximately the 7th until the 13th centuries, the Tai, who may have originated in what is now Guangxi in China and bordering areas of Northwest Vietnam, gradually populated the Mekong, Chao Praya, and Salween river valleys, fuelled by a sophisticated rice production system. Strong Tai societies emerged on the Shan plateau in upper Myanmar, along the Mekong in the north in Xishuangbanna, in the Yuan empire of Lan Na, and in the Middle Mekong in the Lao empire of Lan Xang. These societies subsequently developed into polities, for example Chiang Mai, the capital of Lan Na, and Sukhothai. The most powerful to emerge was Ayutthaya, which superseded Sukhothai in the 16th century. From the 16th to the 18th centuries the Burmese expanded east, occupying Lan Na and parts of the Xishuangbanna and eventually destroying Ayutthaya. Nonetheless, Thonburi, the Tai successor state to Ayutthaya, established suzerainty over the Lanna, Luang Prabang, and Malay states and thereby defeated the Burmese, ensuring the primacy of the Tai ethnic groups in the region.

The nation-building era 
Under the Bangkok-based Chakri dynasty, Siam formally incorporated and integrated large numbers of ethnically Laotian people, themselves formed of various subgroups. Siam brought the remaining Lan Xang city-states of Vientiane (destroyed in 1827) and Champasak under direct control in the 19th century. What remained of Lan Na became a vassal until 1896, when it was formally annexed, incorporating large numbers of Kham muang speakers, together with the various ethnic groups sometimes called 'hill tribes', such as the Karen.

In the Malay Peninsula, Siam extended formal rule over large numbers of Malay people. In 1816, Siam divided the Muslim tributary Sultanate of Patani into seven provinces as part of a policy of 'divide and rule'. Via administrative modernisation, in 1901 Siam incorporated all seven provinces into ‘Monthon Patani’, under the new Ministry of Interior. When Kedah was ceded to the English under the Anglo–Siamese Treaty of 1909, in exchange for what became Satun Province, Thailand thereby cemented its official rule over hundreds of thousands of Malay people.

Siamese suzerainty over present-day Laos, together with some Cambodian provinces, was permanently ceded to the French during the formation of French Indochina. In the early Chakri dynasty period, Siamese armies had invaded areas of Laos and returned with large numbers of prisoners of war, especially Phuan and Tai Dam peoples, who were subsequently resettled in the central plains. During the nation-building era, Siam's ethnic map became more varied, as the majority of the peoples of the Khorat plateau, once part of Lan Xang empire, were formally integrated into Siam, incorporating more Lao, Khorat, and Phu Thai, but also smaller ethnic groups such as the Yoy and So, together with the Khmu, Kuy, and Nyahkur along the Khmer border.

As part of Chinese emigration, Thailand received Chinese immigrants over several hundred years, and especially during the nineteenth and early twentieth centuries, until the 1930s, meaning many Thai urban centres now have ethnically Chinese populations (mainly Teochew speakers).

Development of Thai ethnocentrism 
The 1904 Siamese census deliberately omitted the Lao ethnic identity so as to discourage further French colonial predations, resulting in the Thai officially becoming 85% of the population by ethnicity, rising to 89% in 1912. In the 1900s, membership of the Thai 'race' came to form the basis of citizenship of the modern Thai nation-state. In the 1930s, Thai nationalist Luang Wichitwathakan developed ethnocentric policy which came to equate the Tai linguistic family with a greater pan-Thai race-based ‘nation.’ The first of the 12 Cultural Mandates, of June 24, 1939, renamed Siam ‘Thailand’, or as it was during the Second World War, the ‘Great Thai Empire’, an assertion of Thai imperial identity over subject peoples. Then, in 1943, the influential National Culture Commission, which has survived in various incarnations until the present day (as the Thai Ministry of Culture) was established in order to define and disseminate official Thai national culture.

Post-war era 
Thailand received an influx of tens of thousands of Vietnamese after the end of the French Indochina war. During the Cold War, further nation-building resulted in a polity where 'Thai' and 'Tai' continued to be deliberately conflated and, in the official discourse, nearly everyone was ethnically Thai and so spoke Thai or Thai ‘dialects’, as the regional languages and most smaller Tai languages were described. From the 1960s, census data described up to 99% of the population as ethnically Thai. Nonetheless, academic research of the Cold War period suggests that of these, only 33% spoke Central Thai, with over 50% speaking Lao dialects (Isan), an indication of the number of ethnic Lao or users of Lao as a second language or lingua franca for the Northeast. Thai censuses still do not disaggregate by either the largest or smallest ethnic groups and so reflect Thai national identity rather than the scientific consensus. Thailand saw an influx of a large number of Northern Khmer during the rule of the Khmer Rouge, some of whom permanently settled with indigenous Khmer.

Official and academic position 

According to the Royal Thai Government's 2011 Country Report to the UN committee responsible for the International Convention on the Elimination of All Forms of Racial Discrimination, available from the Department of Rights and Liberties Promotion of the Thai Ministry of Justice, 62 ethnolinguistic communities are officially recognised in Thailand. However, of these, only 56 were listed in the Ministry of Social Development and Human Security's 2015 Master Plan for the Development of Ethnic Groups in Thailand 2015-2017, with the larger, ethnoregional ethnic communities, including the Central Thai, being omitted; it, therefore, covers only 9.7% of the population. Twenty million Central Thai (together with approximately 650,000 Khorat Thai) made up approximately 20,650,000 (34.1 percent) of the nation's population of 60,544,937 at the time of completion of the Mahidol University Ethnolinguistic Maps of Thailand data (1997), which provides population numbers for most ethnolinguistic minorities.

The 2011 Thailand Country Report provides population numbers for mountain peoples ("hill tribes") and ethnic communities in the northeast and is explicit about its reliance on the Mahidol University Ethnolinguistic Maps of Thailand data. Thus, though over 3.288 million people in the northeast alone could not be categorised, the population and percentages of other ethnic communities c. 1997 are known and constitute minimum populations. In descending order, the largest (equal to or greater than 400,000) are:
15,080,000 Lao (24.9 percent) consisting of the Thai Lao (14 million) and other smaller Lao-related groups, namely the Thai Loei (400-500,000), Lao Lom (350,000), Lao Wiang/Klang (200,000), Lao Khrang (90,000), Lao Ngaew (30,000), and Lao Ti (10,000)
six million Khon Muang (9.9 percent, also called Northern Thais)
4.5 million Pak Tai (7.5 percent, also called Southern Thais)
1.4 million Khmer Leu (2.3 percent, also called Northern Khmer)
900,000 Malay (1.5 percent)
500,000 Nyaw (0.8 percent)
470,000 Phu Thai (0.8 percent)
400,000 Kuy/Kuay (also Suay) (0.7 percent)
350,000 Karen (0.6 percent).

Khmer and Mon-Khmer make up approximately 6 percent, the Malays of southern Thailand make up around 3 percent. Among the groups categorized as hill tribes in the northern provinces, Hmong (Mien), Karen, and other small hill tribes make up over 1 percent.

In official Thai documents, the term "hill tribe" (chao khao) began to appear in the 1960s. This term highlights a "hill and valley" dichotomy that is based on an ancient social relationship existing in most of northern and western Thailand, as well as in Sipsongpanna and northern Vietnam. For the most part the Dai/Tai/Thai occupied the more fertile intermontane basins and valleys, while the less powerful groups lived at the less rich higher elevations. This dichotomy was often accompanied by a master/serf relationship. Vestiges of this dichotomy remain today: for example, 30 percent of ethnic minority children in Thailand cannot read by second grade. The corresponding figure for Bangkok is one percent.

List (by population size)

Tais – c. 53–56.5 million
Central Thai (Siamese) – c. 25 million
Isan (Thai-Lao; Thai Isan; Isan Lao) – c. 18.5–20 million
Yuan (Thai Yuan; Lanna) – c. 6–7 million
Southern Thai (Thai Pak Tai, Southern Siamese) – c. 5.5 million
Chinese (primarily Teochew ) – c. 6–9 million
assimilated Sino-Thai (Luk Chin) – > 4.5 million
non-assimilated Chinese – c. 1.4 million
Malays – 2–4 million
Khmer – > 1.2 million
Karen – c. 1 million
Phu Thai – 470,000
Thai Indians (multiple ancestries) – 450,000
Kuy – 400,000
Pakistanis – 250,000
Hmong – 250,000
Lao – 222,000
Phuan – 200,000
Mon – 114,500
Lahu – 100,000
Shan (Thai Yai)– 95,000
Lue (Thai Lü) – 83,000
Iranians – 70,000
Sô – 70,000
Nyaw – 50,000
Tai Ya – 50,000
Lua – 48,000
Lisu – 40,000
Yao – 40,000
Bru – 25,000
Akha – c. 20,000
Phai – 20,000
Vietnamese – 17,662
Lawa – 17,000
Saek – 11,000
Khmu – 10,000
Khun (Thai Khun) – 6,280
Palaung (De'ang) – 5,000
Cham – 4,000
Urak Lawoi – 3,000
Moken – c. 2,000
Nyahkur (Nyah Kur, Chao-bon) – 1,500
Tai Dam (Black Tai) – 700
Chong – less than 500
Pear – less than 500
Sa'och – less than 500
Mlabri – less than 400
Mani (Negrito) – 300
Lolo (Yi) – unknown

List by language group

The following table comprises all the ethnolinguistic identities recognised by the Royal Thai Government in the 2011 Country Report to the UN Committee responsible for the International Convention for the Elimination of All Forms of Racial Discrimination, available from the Department of Rights and Liberties Promotion of the Thai Ministry of Justice

Five ethnolinguistic families of Thailand recognized by the Royal Thai Government

The following table shows all the ethnic groups of Northeast Thailand, as recognised in the same report.

Ethnic groups of Northeast Thailand by language family

Note that population numbers are for the northeast region only. Languages may have additional speakers outside the northeast.

See also
Demographics of Thailand
Languages of Thailand
Nationality, religion, and language data for the provinces of Thailand

Further reading

References

External links
Ethnologue report for Thailand

 
Ethnic groups